Tondaimandalam, also known as Tondai Nadu, is a historical region located in the northernmost part of Tamil Nadu and southernmost part of Andhra Pradesh. The region comprises the districts which formed a part of the legendary kingdom of Athondai Chakravarti. The boundaries of Tondaimandalam are ambiguous – between the river basins of Penna River and Ponnaiyar River. During the reign of Rajaraja I, this region was called as Jayankonda Cholamandalam.

Geography
The region includes the Nellore, Chittoor, North and South Arcot and Chingleput districts of the Andhra and Madras states. Chennai was part of the region.

The core area covers the present day areas of Nellore, Chittoor, Tirupati, Annamayya, Vellore, Ranipet, Tirupattur, Tiruvanamalai, Villupuram, Kallakuruchi, Tiruvallur, Kanchipuram, Chengalpattu, Cuddalore and Chennai districts of modern-day Andhra Pradesh and Tamil Nadu.

History
Neolithic burial urn, cairn circles and jars with burials dating to the very dawn of the common era have been discovered near Mamallapuram. The area was part of the Dravida Kingdom mentioned in the Mahabharata It then came under the rule of Early Cholas during first century CE with the capital of Tondai Nadu as Kanchipuram. Historian S. Krishnaswami Aiyengar and the Proceedings of the First Annual Conference of South Indian History Congress note: The word Tondai means a creeper and the term Pallava conveys a similar meaning. In the 3rd century CE, Tondai Nadu was ruled by Ilandiraiyan, the first king with the title "Tondaiman", whom P. T. Srinivasa Iyengar identifies with a Pallava prince. Pallavas  moved southwards, adopted local traditions to their own use, and named themselves as Tondaiyar after the land called Tondai. The medieval Pallavas ruled Andhra and Northern Tamil Nadu, from the 4th to the 9th centuries, with their seat of capital at ancient Kanchipuram. 

It was captured by the Medieval Chola king Aditya I (ruled c. 871–907 CE) who defeated the armies of the Pallava ruler Aparajitavarman (880897) in about 890. and claimed all of Tondai Nadu as Chola territory.  During the reign of Uttama Chola most of Tondaimandalam had been recovered from the Rashtrakutas. The province was renamed Jayamkonda Cholamandalam during the reign of King Raja Raja Chola I (9851014), The Tamil poem of Kalingattuparani mentions the conquest of Telangana by Karunakara Tondaiman, a general of Chola Emperor Kulottunga I who handed the reigns of Tondaimandalam to his illegitimate son Adondai. In about 1218, the Pandya king Maravarman Sundara Pandyan (12161238) invaded the kingdom. It was stopped by the intervention of the Hoysala king Vira Narasimha II (12201235), who fought on the side of the Chola king Kulothunga Chola III.

The region was then a part of Vijayanagara Empire, first ruling from Hampi and then headquartered at Chandragiri in present-day Andhra Pradesh. The earliest inscriptions attesting to Vijayanagara rule are those of Kumara Kampana, who defeated the Madurai Sultanate in 1361. from 1364 and 1367, which were found in the precincts of the Kailasanathar Temple and Varadharaja Perumal Temple respectively. The Vijayanagara rulers who controlled the area, appointed chieftains known as Nayaks who ruled over the different regions of the province almost independently. Throughout the second half of the 16th and first half of the 17th centuries, the Aravidu Dynasty tried to maintain a semblance of authority in the southern parts after losing their northern territories in the Battle of Talikota. 

Venkata II (15861614) tried to revive the Vijayanagara Empire, but the kingdom relapsed into confusion after his death and rapidly fell apart after the Vijayanagara king Sriranga III's defeat by the Golconda and Bijapur sultanates in 1646. The Nawabdom of the Carnatic was established by the Mughal Emperor Aurangzeb, who in 1692 appointed Zulfiqar Ali Khan as the first Nawab of the Carnatic. The area saw Maratha rule during the Carnatic period in 1724 and 1740, and the Nizam of Hyderabad in 1742. It was formally annexed by the British East India Company as per the Doctrine of Lapse after the death of Ghulam Muhammad Ghouse Khan. During the British Rule, the whole region was a part of the Madras Presidency.

References

Sources
 
 
 
 

Pallava dynasty
Chola dynasty
Regions of Tamil Nadu
Natural regions of Asia